Cryptoblabes euraphella is a species of snout moth in the genus Cryptoblabes. It was described by Edward Meyrick in 1879, and is known from Australia.

References

Moths described in 1879
Cryptoblabini